The Aquatarium is a non-profit interactive science and education museum located in Brockville, Ontario, Canada. The facility focuses on the history and ecology of the Thousand Islands region of the Saint Lawrence River.

References

External links
Official website

Brockville
Natural history museums in Canada
Science museums in Canada
Museums in Ontario